Hershel Eldridge McGriff Sr. (born December 14, 1927) is an American professional stock car racing driver. A long-time competitor in the NASCAR K&N Pro Series West, formerly known as the Winston West Series, he won the series' 1986 championship, and is also a four-time winner in Grand National competition. He most recently drove the No. 04 Toyota Camry for Bill McAnally Racing in 2018.

Racing career
McGriff first raced on September 16, 1945, right after racing resumed in the United States after World War II. He was the winner of the first Carrera Panamericana in 1950, where he met NASCAR founder Bill France, Sr. France convinced McGriff to come south and race in NASCAR races at Daytona Beach, the first Southern 500 race at Darlington Raceway, Detroit, and Raleigh.

France convinced McGriff to race full-time in NASCAR in 1954. He had his four wins that year in the Grand National series, the first coming at Bay Meadows Speedway. He had 17 top-10 finishes in 24 events and finished sixth in the final points standings. McGriff's average finishing position was higher than points champion Lee Petty.

McGriff had two options to choose from for the 1955 season. He was offered a ride in NASCAR to race for millionaire Carl Kiekhaefer's newly formed team. McGriff decided to return home to the West Coast to be closer to his family and to tend to his growing timber and mill business. Tim Flock drove Kiekhaefer's Chrysler 300 to 18 victories that season and  the season championship.

McGriff returned to racing after not racing for around ten years. He started 41st at Riverside in 1967 and had moved up to second place by the sixth lap. He beat Ron Grable in a photo finish that day.

He became the oldest driver to win a NASCAR feature race when he won an AutoZone West Series race in 1989 at the age of 61. His 14 wins at the defunct Riverside International Raceway is the most at NASCAR-sanctioned events and he was chosen as the grand marshal for the final race at the track in 1988.

In November 1996, McGriff made the trip with several NASCAR champions, current Winston Cup, Busch Grand National, and Craftsman Truck Series drivers to Japan's Suzuka Raceway for an exhibition race.  He started 26th and finished 25th in what was called the NASCAR Suzuka Thunder Special. 

He announced his retirement following the 2002 season.

With later starts in the Camping World/K&N Pro Series East and West, he set and broke his records as the oldest driver in series history. 

In 2018, at the age of 90, he announced plans to run the K&N West races at Tucson Speedway, and upon starting became the oldest person to contest in a race sanctioned by NASCAR.

Career awards
McGriff was inducted in the West Coast Stock Car Hall of Fame in its first class in 2002. 

He was inducted into the Motorsports Hall of Fame of America in 2006.

McGriff, who retired from driving at age 74 said, "This is fantastic, getting in the Hall of Fame, but, hey, I might not be through yet. When I turn 80 [in two years], I just might go out to a short track and show the young guys that I can still do it."

In 2023, he was inducted in the NASCAR Hall of Fame, alongside 2003 Cup Series Champion, Matt Kenseth, 4-Time Cup Series winning crew chief, Kirk Shelmerdine, and NASCAR Executive, Mike Helton.

Personal life
McGriff's son Hershel Jr. currently races Outlaw Late Models, while his granddaughter Mariah competes in the NASCAR Whelen All-American Series' Super Late Model and Pro Stock divisions.

Motorsports career results

NASCAR
(key) (Bold – Pole position awarded by qualifying time. Italics – Pole position earned by points standings or practice time. * – Most laps led.)

Grand National Series

Winston Cup Series

Daytona 500

K&N Pro Series West

ARCA Hooters SuperCar Series
(key) (Bold – Pole position awarded by qualifying time. Italics – Pole position earned by points standings or practice time. * – Most laps led.)

24 Hours of Le Mans results

References

External links

Living people
1927 births
Sportspeople from Portland, Oregon
Racing drivers from Oregon
24 Hours of Le Mans drivers
NASCAR drivers
Trans-Am Series drivers
World Sportscar Championship drivers
NASCAR Hall of Fame inductees
Carrera Panamericana drivers